Midway is an unincorporated community in Crawford County, Kansas, United States.

History
Midway had its start as a mining town, and was once a major railway shipping point of coal.

A post office was opened in Midway in February, 1871, but it closed in March, 1878. It re-opened in August, 1886, at which time it was renamed Nyack. In May, 1887, the old name Midway was restored. The post office closed permanently in 1912.

References

Further reading

External links
 Crawford County maps: Current, Historic, KDOT

Unincorporated communities in Crawford County, Kansas
Unincorporated communities in Kansas